Eduard Anatolyevich Yugrin (born 9 September 1968) is a former Russian professional footballer.

Club career
He made his professional debut in the Soviet Second League in 1987 for FC Turbina Brezhnev. He played 5 games in the UEFA Intertoto Cup 1996 for FC KAMAZ-Chally Naberezhnye Chelny.

References

1968 births
Sportspeople from Yekaterinburg
Living people
Soviet footballers
Russian footballers
Association football defenders
FC KAMAZ Naberezhnye Chelny players
Russian Premier League players